The acoustic tubercle is a nucleus on the end of the cochlear nerve.

The cochlear nerve is lateral to the root of the vestibular nerve. Its fibers end in two nuclei: one, the accessory nucleus, lies immediately in front of the inferior peduncle; the other, the acoustic tubercle, somewhat lateral to it.

References

External links
 https://web.archive.org/web/20100714184556/http://braininfo.rprc.washington.edu/centraldirectory.aspx?ID=633

Vestibulocochlear nerve